Desert Spring may refer to:
 Desert Spring, California, a former settlement in Kern County, California
 Operation Desert Spring, an operation in Kuwait by the United States

See also 
 Desert Springs (disambiguation)